Tremelling is a surname. Notable people with the surname include:

Billy Tremelling (1905–1961), English footballer
Dan Tremelling (1897–1978), English footballer
Janine Tremelling (born 1967), Australian tennis player
John Tremelling (1929–2016), Australian sport shooter
Michelle Tremelling (born 1969), Australian archer
Sol Tremelling (1887–1960), English Footballer